Meg Ann Elis (born 26 October 1950), also known as Marged Dafydd or Margaret Dafydd, is a Welsh writer, translator and language activist. She stood unsuccessfully as a Plaid Cymru candidate for the Delyn constituency in the National Assembly for Wales election in 1999 and again in 2007.

Life and work
Meg Elis was born into a Welsh-speaking family in Aberystwyth, the daughter of politician T. I. Ellis and his wife, Mari Ellis, and studied at Bangor University. She was a director of the translation company NEWID ("CHANGE"), and has worked as a Welsh/English translator, journalist and radio producer. During the 1980s, she was a member of the protest group at the Greenham Common Women's Peace Camp.

In 1985, her novel, Cyn Daw'r Gaeaf won the Prose Medal, one of the major prizes at the National Eisteddfod in Rhyl.  Her other works included Carchar and I'r Gad, both published by Y Lolfa. Her novels have been cited as good examples of the more controversial themes dealt with by a younger generation of Welsh-language writers in the 1980s.

References

1950 births
Living people
Plaid Cymru politicians
Welsh-language writers
People from Aberystwyth